"The Screwfly Solution" is a 1977 science fiction short story by Raccoona Sheldon, a pen name for American psychologist Alice Sheldon, who was better known by her other nom de plume James Tiptree, Jr.  When the story was first published in June 1977, the identity of Alice Sheldon as both Tiptree and "Raccoona" Sheldon was unknown to the public or anyone in the science fiction community; a series of events triggered by the death of Sheldon's mother Mary Hastings Bradley in October 1977 resulted in the identity behind the pen-names being revealed by the end of the same year.  

"The Screwfly Solution" received the Nebula Award for Best Novelette in 1978, and has been adapted into a television film.

The title refers to the sterile insect technique, a technique of eradicating the population of screwflies by the release of large amounts of sterilized males that would compete with fertile males, thus reducing the native population more with each generation this is done. This story concerns a similar distortion of human sexuality with disastrous results.

Plot summary
The story begins with an exchange of letters and news clippings between Alan, a scientist working on parasite eradication using sterile insect technique in Colombia, and his wife Anne Alstein at home in the U.S., concerning an epidemic of organized murder of women by men.

The murderers feel it is a natural instinct and have constructed elaborate misogynistic rationalizations for it. For example, a new religious movement is spreading along with the murders: the Sons of Adam, who believe that women are evil, that the Garden of Eden was a paradise before women were introduced, and that God is telling them to get rid of all of the women, and after that, God will either make everyone live forever or reveal a better way to reproduce (they were unclear about what exactly would happen). When the religion initially arises, prior to the organized murders, little is done to stop the ideology’s spread, nor are their actions of evicting women from the areas the men control prevented.

Some women fought back, such as three women who stole an Air Force plane and bombed Dallas, but there was no organized resistance.

Initially, there was extensive censoring of the news, as the government believed that it was a case of mass psychological hysteria, and could be snuffed out by suppressing the news, thus preventing its spread.

However, a minority of scientists figured out the truth: Some kind of infective agent is spread in the atmosphere, turning human male sexual impulses into violent ones.

Alan, a sensitive, kindly man, realizes that he himself is succumbing and tries to resist the impulses, as well as isolate himself from women. While this occurs, his wife and teenaged daughter have a number of mother-daughter conflicts: the daughter, faithful to her father, refuses to believe her mother’s warnings about him. She sneaks off to visit her father, and he murders her, killing himself after the horrific realization of his action.

Anne flees north, to Canada, since the disease began in the tropical zones and spread outward. After most of the world’s women are dead, adult men start murdering boys. In the end, Anne, pursued by an entire society bent on femicide, discovers the source and motivation behind the plague: an alien species is intentionally causing the human race to destroy itself so that the aliens can have Earth for themselves.

Explanation of key concepts 

 Barnhard Braithwaite – aka Barney. Professor of insects.
 Alan – Husband of Anne Alstein. Professor of insects. Killed Amy. Killed by himself.
 Anne Alstein – Wife of Alan. Probably killed by herself shortly after the story ends.
 Amy – daughter of Alan and Anne Alstein. Killed by Alan.
 “Angels” – aliens who go down to earth to monitor the progress of their human-extermination project.
 The Screwfly Solution – The sterile insect technique for exterminating insect populations. The story gave three examples —the screwfly, the “Spruce budworm”, and the “canefly”.  These 3 examples do not all operate the same way: Female screwflies mate only once, so a sterile male must successfully ‘mate’ to eliminate a female. For the Spruce budworm⁠, “It seems it blocks the male from turning around after he connects with the female, so he mates with her head instead.”. Caneflies mate in big events where many males flock around a few pheromone-releasing females, so the technique was to “Concentrate the pheromone, release sterilized females”.

 Lordosis – A sexual reflex present in most mammals including rodents, elephants, and cats. It happens when a female is mating, and it exhibits as a lowering of the forelimbs, with the rear limbs extended, and hips raised, ventral arching of the spine and a raising, or sideward displacement, of the tail. In the story, it is exaggerated in human females to the point of them passively accepting death by male aggression.

Other media
"The Screwfly Solution" was adapted into a television film by screenwriter Sam Hamm and director Joe Dante for the Showtime network's Masters of Horror series, premiering December 8, 2006. It has also been referenced in Mark Danielewski's project, The Familiar vol. 3.
In the June 1955 issue of Galaxy Science Fiction magazine the subject of Screwflies and their eradication through  is mentioned as a basis for alien invasion in the editorial by H. L. Gold.

Scientific basis 
In 1925, the concept of sham rage was proposed to describe rage-like behaviors in animals with cerebral cortex removed. This is an early discovery of connection between central nervous system and aggressive behaviors.

A 1928 paper reported that electrical stimulation of the hypothalamus can evoke attack behaviour in cats.

A 2011 paper demonstrated  that optogenetic stimulation of neurons in the ventromedial hypothalamus causes male mice to attack both females and inanimate objects, as well as males. Further, it was discovered "overlapping but distinct neuronal subpopulations involved in fighting and mating. Neurons activated during attack are inhibited during mating, suggesting a potential neural substrate for competition between these opponent social behaviours."

See also
Lordosis behavior

References

External links
 
 The Screwfly Solution on Sci Fiction
 
 Interview with Sam Hamm by Avedon Carol about  the Masters of Horror adaptation

Science fiction short stories
Nebula Award for Best Novelette-winning works
1977 short stories
Works originally published in Analog Science Fiction and Fact
Sterilization (medicine)
Works by James Tiptree Jr.